Ladyman is a surname. Notable people with the surname include:

 David Ladyman, American game designer
 Jack Ladyman (born 1947), American mechanical engineer and politician
 Samuel Ladyman (1643–1684), Anglican priest in Ireland
 Stephen Ladyman (born 1952), British politician